{{Speciesbox
|image = 
|genus = Cerobasis
|species =  annulata
|authority = (Hagen, 1865)
|synonyms =
Clothilla annulata Hagen, 1865
|synonyms_ref = 
}}Cerobasis annulata'' is a species of Psocoptera from Trogiidae family that can be found in Austria, Azores, Belgium, Cyprus, France, Germany, Great Britain, Greece, Italy, Luxembourg, Madeira, Norway, Poland, Portugal, Switzerland, and the Netherlands.

References

Trogiidae
Insects described in 1865
Psocoptera of Europe